Ringstraßenpalais is an Austrian-West German television series.

Cast
In alphabetical order
Erich Auer as Minister
Karlheinz Böhm as Bernie Artenberg
Jean-Claude Bouillon as Claude
Ivan Desny as Richard von Wintrop
Vernon Dobtcheff as Major Georges Comte de Castroux
Richard Eybner as Card player
Erik Frey as General Bernhard Graf Artenberg
Olga Georges-Picot as Michèle
Karlheinz Hackl as Dr. Paul Ender jr.
Attila Hörbiger as Pater Florian
Michael Janisch as Kriminalbeamter
Dagmar Koller as Anni Berte
Ida Krottendorf as Bertha
Gerlinde Locker as Poldi Artenberg
Josef Meinrad as Emil Hoffeneder
Kurt Meisel as Dr. Wirtsbacher
Fritz Muliar as Imre Kelemen
Paul Muller as Comte de Castroux
Susi Nicoletti as Durchlaucht Antonie Fürstin Slansky
Maria Perschy as Madame
Rudolf Prack as Ferdinand
Wolfgang Preiss as General Prettwitz
Imre Ráday as Pista
Lukas Resetarits as Erwin
Sieghardt Rupp as Hermann
Hans-Jürgen Schatz as Walter Klopf
Heinrich Schweiger as Eduard Baumann
Bert Sotlar as Joka Jovanovic
Franz Stoss as General
Jane Tilden as Sophie
Friedrich von Thun as Bernhard Graf Artenberg
Klausjürgen Wussow as SS Standartenführer

See also 
List of Austrian television series

External links 
 

Austrian television series
ORF (broadcaster) original programming
1980s Austrian television series
1980 Austrian television series debuts
1986 Austrian television series endings
1980 German television series debuts
1986 German television series endings
Television series set in the 19th century
Television series set in the 1900s
Television series set in the 1910s
Television series set in the 1920s
Television series set in the 1930s
Television series set in the 1940s
Television series set in the 1950s
German-language television shows